Cipele is a song recorded by Croatian pop recording artist Nina Badrić. It was self-released 22 October 2015. The song was written by Nina Badrić and Alan Hržica. It was produced and recorded in Zagreb.

Weekly charts

References 

2015 singles
2015 songs